Karizan may refer to:
 Karizan, Razavi Khorasan
 Karizan, South Khorasan
 Karizan Rural District, in Razavi Khorasan Province